Freising station is located in the town of Freising in the German state of Bavaria. It is located a few hundred metres to the south of the Domberg ("cathedral hill") on the southern edge of the old town.

History

The station was opened in 1858 during the construction of the line from Munich to Landshut. In 1859 this was extended to Regensburg. The line to Landshut was duplicated in 1891/92. The section from Munich to Freising was electrified in 1925; this was completed to Regensburg in 1927. The station was the target of an air raid shortly before the end of the Second World War, on 18 April 1945. 224 people died at the station and in the surrounding area and the station was destroyed. The new station was opened in 1953. Since 1972, Freising has been served by the Munich S-Bahn, which was established in that year. Until 1973, the Hallertau Local Railway (Hallertauer Lokalbahn) operated on the line to Landshut as far as Langenbach, where it branched off towards Hallertau. Since 2006, the trackwork in Freising station has been remotely controlled from Munich.

Rail services

Freising station has four platform tracks next to two central platforms. The platforms are accessible via two tunnels. One connects with the station building and is equipped with lifts and ramps to make it accessible for the disabled. The other tunnel is at the northern end of the platform and has stairs only. Track 1 is served by Regionalbahn services to Landshut, Plattling and Regensburg. The through Regionalbahn services, Regional-Express and ‘’Alex’’ services towards Munich Hauptbahnhof stop on track 2. Track 4 is served by through trains towards Landshut and Passau or Regensburg and Nuremberg. To the southeast of the platform tracks there is a through track for overtaking and two sidings for the parking of S-Bahn trains overnight. The two sidings can only be reached from the Landshut side of the station, since the connection from the direction of Munich has been broken. Previously, there were other freight tracks, but these are out of operation. Sindings connected to the tractor manufacturers Schlüter and BayWa among others.

Buses

The bus station for the Freising city buses is at the northern end of the platform on the side facing the town centre. Almost all routes have their start and end points here. This includes  line 635, which connects Freising with Munich Airport. Since the Airport has no rail connection with eastern Bavaria, this can be used to reach the airport from that direction. Buses to Lerchenfeld run from a stop on the southeastern side of the station. South-west of the station building is the bus station for regional services.

Road 

Federal highway B 11, one of the main thoroughfares of Freising, runs directly north of the station. The station forecourt is also on this side of the station. This is also a taxi rank. only a few parking spaces are available is on this side of the station.

On the south side of the tracks there is a large park-and-ride car park with almost 1,000 parking spaces. There are nearly 1,600, mostly covered, spaces for bicycles in several places around the station.

Other 
The station building has a station bookstore, a Deutsche Bahn travel centre and a branch of Yorma's (fast food). A McDonald's store has been opened in space released as a result of the installation of electronic interlockings on the tracks. The Freising boarding house and a post office are a few metres from the station.

References

Munich S-Bahn stations
Railway stations in Germany opened in 1858
Buildings and structures in Freising (district)